I Have Three Hands is a 1985 Filipino comedy film directed by Luciano B. Carlos, written by Carlos and Jose Javier Reyes, and starring the comedy trio of Tito Sotto, Vic Sotto, and Joey de Leon, as well as Maricel Soriano, Sheryl Cruz, Manilyn Reynes, Chuckie Dreyfuss, and Kristina Paner. The film's title is a play on the nursery rhyme "I Have Two Hands".

Plot
Bitoy, Atoy and Caloy (Tito, Vic and Joey respectively) are 3 hapless brothers who got employed by a rich couple to take care of their children who turned out to be spoiled brats who have successfully driven out all their nannies from their house through their improvised booby traps. But the brothers stuck through with the children until the end. In the midst of all the mess comes Bridget (Maricel Soriano) who is their next-door neighbor's maid.  She becomes the Agatep brothers' object of affection, but unknown to them she also brings trouble.

Cast
Tito Sotto as Jovito "Bitoy" Agatep
Vic Sotto as Fortunato "Atoy" Agatep
Joey de Leon as Carlos "Caloy" Agatep
Maricel Soriano as Bridget
Sheryl Cruz
Manilyn Reynes
Chuckie Dreyfuss
Kristina Paner
Debraliz
Dely Atay-Atayan
Subas Herrero as Don Severino
Amado Pineda
Tani Cinco
Evelyn Vargas
Flora Gasser
Anna Feliciano
Rey Solo
Aurora Yumul
Jay Imperial
Perry de Guzman
Alex Toledo
Arnel Bilaro
Jimmy Tongco
George Gyness

Production

Music
Tito Sotto and Homer Flores composed the musical score of I Have Three Hands. An instrumental version of "We Are the World" is played throughout the film, and by the end, a parody song titled "Maid in the Philippines" is performed by the characters in a similar way to the USA for Africa music video.

Home media
I Have Three Hands was released on DVD by Regal Capital in 2009 paired with another film also starring the comedy trio, Shoot That Ball.

The entire film was made available on YouTube for streaming without charge by Regal Entertainment on September 4, 2019.

References

External links

1985 films
1985 comedy films
Filipino-language films
Maids in films
Philippine comedy films
Regal Entertainment films
APT Entertainment films
M-Zet Productions films
Films directed by Luciano B. Carlos